The Tartan 33 is family of American sailboats, that was designed by Sparkman & Stephens and first built in 1979.

The Tartan 33R design was developed into the Tartan 34-2 in 1984, by extending the stern and changing the  interior layout.

Production
The boat line was built by Tartan Marine in the United States between 1979 and 1984, but it is now out of production. Tartan completed 201 Tartan 33s and 14 Tartan 33 R models.

Design
The Tartan 33 line are all small recreational keelboats, built predominantly of fiberglass, with wood trim. They have internally-mounted spade-type rudders and fixed keels.

Variants
Tartan 33 (hull numbers 1-20)
This model was introduced in 1979 and about 20 were built in this configuration. The boat has a PHRF racing average handicap of 162 with a high of 162 and low of 168.
Tartan 33 (Hull numbers 21-201)
This model was introduced in 1979 and about 181 were built in this configuration.
Tartan 33 R
This model was also introduced in 1979 and 14 examples were built. It was intended to be a more competitive racing boat than the Tartan 33 and has a masthead sloop rig. The boat has a PHRF racing average handicap of 156 with a high of 162 and low of 153.

See also
List of sailing boat types

Related development
Tartan 34-2

Similar sailboats
Catalina 34
CS 34
Hunter 34
S&S 34
UFO 34 (yacht)

References

Keelboats
1970s sailboat type designs
Sailing yachts
Sailboat type designs by Sparkman and Stephens
Sailboat types built by Tartan Marine